100% Hits: The Best of 2004 is a 2-disc compilation album released by EMI Music Australia and Warner Music Australia. The album was certified gold in Australia.

Track listing

Disc 1
Jamelia – "Superstar" (3:35)
Starsailor – "Four to the Floor" (Thin White Duke Mix) (4:36)
Kelis – "Milkshake" (3:07)
Freestylers – "Push Up" (3:57)
Kevin Lyttle – "Turn Me On" (3:22)
Fabolous featuring Tamia – "Into You" (4:56)
Scribe – "Stand Up" (4:16)
Kylie Minogue – "Red Blooded Woman" (4:21)
N.E.R.D – "She Wants to Move" (3:35)
Boogie Pimps – "Somebody to Love" (Saltshaker Remix) (3:00)
Chingy featuring J-Weav – "One Call Away" (4:21)
Missy Elliott – "Pass That Dutch" (3:43)
Jewel – "Stand" (3:15)
Simple Plan – "Perfect" (4:39)
LMC vs. U2 – "Take Me to the Clouds Above" (2:51)
Stellar Project featuring Brandi Emma – "Get Up Stand Up" (2:56)
Mr. Timothy featuring Inaya Day – "I Am Tha 1" (3:30)
Hilary Duff – "Come Clean" (3:36)
Jentina – "Bad Ass Strippa" (2:51)
J-Wess featuring Lolly, Kulaia and MC Digga – "What Chu Want"
Solitaire – "I Like Love (I Love Love)" (3:48)

Disc 2
Finn Brothers – "Won't Give In" (4:18)
Matchbox Twenty – "All I Need" (3:40)
Michael Bublé – "Sway" (Junkie XL Mix) (3:09)
Missy Higgins – "Greed for Your Love" (4:08)
Joss Stone – "Super Duper Love" (4:20)
Norah Jones – "Sunrise" (3:20)
Kasey Chambers – "Like a River" (3:49)
Jet – "Look What You've Done" (3:52)
Little Birdy – "This Is a Love Song" (2:31)
The Streets – "Fit but You Know It" (4:13)
The Dissociatives – "Somewhere Down the Barrel" (4:20)
Eskimo Joe – "From the Sea" (3:21)
Fountains of Wayne – "Stacy's Mom" (3:18)
Steriogram – "Walkie Talkie Man" (2:15)
Yellowcard – "Ocean Avenue" (3:20)
The Vines – "Ride" (2:38)
John Butler Trio – "Zebra" (3:57)
The Cat Empire – "Days Like These" (3:50)
k.d. lang – "Helpless" (4:15)
The Corrs – "Summer Sunshine" (2:51)
Alex Lloyd – "Beautiful" (3:22)
Michelle Branch – "Breathe" (3:22)

References

External links
 100% Hits: The Best Of 2004

2004 compilation albums
EMI Records compilation albums
2004 in Australian music